Cingulina bellardii is a species of sea snail, a marine gastropod mollusk in the family Pyramidellidae, the pyrams and their allies.

Distribution
This species occurs throughout various underwater geographical formations situated within the Red Sea.

References

External links
 To World Register of Marine Species

Pyramidellidae
Gastropods described in 1924